Farmington is a town in and the county seat of Franklin County, Maine, United States. As of the 2020 census, its population was 7,592. Farmington is home to the University of Maine at Farmington, Nordica Memorial Auditorium, the Nordica Homestead, and the annual Farmington Fair.

History

The area was once territory of the Canibas tribe of Abenaki Indians. They had two camps located near Farmington Falls, with fields cleared for cultivation of maize and potatoes. Their fort's stockade enclosed about an acre at the center of what is today Farmington Falls village. A group from Topsham arrived in 1776 to explore the area and lay out a town, called Plantation No. 1 or Sandy River Plantation, but permanent settlement was delayed by the Revolutionary War.

In 1781, the first settlers arrived, the same year a sawmill was established. On February 1, 1794, Sandy River Plantation was incorporated as Farmington, named for its unusually fertile soil. Beginning with a cluster of log houses at Farmington Falls, the town grew quickly and prospered. Agriculture was an important early occupation, with hay a principal product. Orchards yielded apples and other fruit. Farmington became one of the largest wool producing towns in New England, with many herds of sheep grazing the hills and intervales.

The town's water power attracted industry, including five lumber mills, two sash, blind and door factories, two brickyards, a foundry, a rake factory, three gristmills, nearly a dozen carriage factories, a cheese factory, two corn canning factories, two reaper machine factories, a spool factory and a tannery. As a regional center for manufacturing, trade and agriculture, Farmington was designated county seat when Franklin County was formed in 1838. In 1859, the Androscoggin Railroad completed its line from Leeds Junction to Farmington, carrying freight and tourists.

In 1879, the town became the southern terminus for the narrow gauge Sandy River Railroad (later part of the Sandy River and Rangeley Lakes Railroad), making it a gateway to the Rangeley Lake and Sugarloaf Mountain areas. Farmington suffered a devastating fire on October 22, 1886, when thirty-three houses, nineteen stores, three churches, the county jail and the post office were destroyed. The 1877 Methodist Church designed by noted architect Arthur H. Vinal survived. Farmington is today a college town and resort area.

Geography
Farmington is drained by Wilson Stream, Temple Stream, Beaver Brook and the Sandy River.

The town is crossed by U.S. Route 2 and Maine State Routes 4, 27, 43, 133 and 149. It borders the towns of Industry and New Sharon to the east, Chesterville to the south, Wilton to the southwest, Temple to the west, and Strong and New Vineyard to the north.

Farmington is divided into four local areas and sometimes mapped as such. They are West Farmington, Fairbanks, Farmington Falls, and Farmington (downtown). Each except Fairbanks has its own zip code, but all are within Farmington's town limits.

Climate

Typically for Maine, Farmington has a humid continental climate (Köppen Dfb) with cold (sometimes severely cold) winters and warm, often humid summers. Winters are cold and snowy, with forty nights per year under  and 68.6 days failing to top freezing.

Precipitation is abundant throughout the year, with snowfall especially heavy in winter.

Demographics

2010 census
As of the census of 2010, there were 7,760 people, 3,072 households, and 1,597 families residing in the town. The racial makeup of the town was 96.9% White, 0.3% African American, 0.4% Native American, 0.3% Asian, 0.1% Pacific Islander, 0.3% from other races, and 1.7% from two or more races. Hispanic or Latino of any race were 1.3% of the population.

There were 3,072 households, of which 23.1% had children under the age of 18 living with them, 38.2% were married couples living together, 9.9% had a female householder with no husband present, 3.9% had a male householder with no wife present, and 48.0% were non-families. 34.1% of all households were made up of individuals, and 13% had someone living alone who was 65 years of age or older. The average household size was 2.17 and the average family size was 2.75.

The median age in the town was 32.1 years. 16% of residents were under the age of 18; 27.2% were between the ages of 18 and 24; 18.3% were from 25 to 44; 23.3% were from 45 to 64; and 15.5% were 65 years of age or older. The gender makeup of the town was 45.3% male and 54.7% female.

2000 census
As of the census of 2000, there were 7,410 people, 2,813 households, and 1,533 families residing in the town. There were 3,048 housing units at an average density of 54.6 persons/sq mi (21.1 persons/km2). The racial makeup of the town was 97.48% White, 0.20% African American, 0.30% Native American, 0.65% Asian, 0.03% Pacific Islander, 0.40% from other races, and 0.94% from two or more races.  0.82% of the population were Hispanic or Latino of any race.

There were 2,813 households, out of which 24.8% had children under the age of 18 living with them, 42.5% were married couples living together, 9.1% have a woman whose husband does not live with her, and 45.5% were non-families. 31.7% of all households were made up of individuals, and 11.8% had someone living alone who was 65 years of age or older.  The average household size was 2.25 and the average family size was 2.87.

In the town, the population was spread out, with 18.4% under the age of 18, 25.0% from 18 to 24, 21.5% from 25 to 44, 19.3% from 45 to 64, and 15.9% who were 65 years of age or older.  The median age was 32 years. For every 100 females, there were 81.0 males.  For every 100 females age 18 and over, there were 75.1 males.

The median income for a household in the town was $26,814, and the median income for a family was $33,656. Males had a median income of $27,569 versus $21,101 for females. The per capita income for the town was $13,982.  About 18.0% of families and 22.6% of the population were below the poverty line, including 30.6% of those under the age of 18 and 5.4% ages 65 or older.

Government

Farmington is the largest town, and county seat, of Franklin County. As a result, it has a number of regional administrative buildings such as a courthouse and DHHS branch. It is governed by a board of selectmen who meet at Town Hall on alternating Tuesdays at 6:30 PM.  Daily administration is by a town manager, and the town holds an annual town meeting in March.

Sites of interest
 Farmington Historical Society
 Nordica Memorial Homestead
 Titcomb Mountain
Sandy River
Mount Blue Middle School
University of Maine at Farmington
Farmington is home to a number of historic properties and districts. These include the Cutler Memorial Library, Farmington Historic District, First Congregational Church, United Church of Christ, Franklin County Courthouse, Free Will Baptist Meetinghouse, Greenacre, Chester Greenwood House, Merrill Hall, Nordica Homestead, Old Union Meetinghouse, Hiram Ramsdell House and the Tufts House.

University of Maine At Farmington 
Farmington is home to The University of Maine at Farmington, part of Maine's public university system. UMF had a full-time enrollment of 1,800 in 2016.

Neighborhoods
Downtown Farmington – The main part of town, downtown has several banks, houses, stores, and public facilities. The University of Maine at Farmington is next to downtown. Downtown is at the intersection of Main Street and Broadway Street.
West Farmington – West Farmington is at the junction of U.S. 2 and SR 43. Titcomb Mountain is in West Farmington. The Whistle Stop Rail-Trail starts at Oakes Street and continues to East Wilton, Wilton and Jay. Bikers, hikers, ATVs, snowmobiles, and cross-country skiers use the trail. There is also a gas station, Madores. The Zip code is 04992.
Farmington Falls – Farmington Falls is at the junction of U.S. 2, SR 41 and SR 156. There are some houses and a church. The Sandy River passes through here. The zip code is 04940.
Fairbanks – Fairbanks once housed a school, and has a trading post and some restaurants. It is at the junction of SR 4 and SR 27. It is part of the 04938 Zip Code. The Lillian Nordica House is in Fairbanks.
Wilton Road – U.S. 2 passes through Farmington. This area is mostly businesses. There is a Walmart, Hannaford, KFC, Taco Bell, Subway, Pizza Hut and Ford, GM, and Chrysler dealerships. There are two Dunkin Donuts off Wilton Road: one near Big Lots, and one near a Citgo gas station. Other businesses are on Wilton Road, where the zip code is 04938.
Front Street – Front Street is a street behind downtown. There are a few houses before the intersection at Broadway. There was a restaurant that served pizza and gelato called the Stone Hearth Cafe (now closed). The Narrow Gauge Square has a cinema, an eye doctor, and a few stores. Prescott Field is for baseball, softball, and soccer for the University of Maine at Farmington. It is the main way to get to the Sandy River swimming area. Giffords is on the corner of Main and Front Streets. Front Street is considered Historic Farmington's main street.

Prophecy
Farmington is the subject of a prophecy by the Quaker Licia Kuenning (formerly Lisa Bieberman) about a Coming New Order in the town.  This was originally prophesied for Tuesday, June 6, 2006 but, after gathering more than 80 people together with no apparent miracles on that date, is now prophesied "within the next few years".

Notable people 

 Edward Abbott, clergyman, journalist, author
 Jacob Abbott, author, educator
 Elizabeth Akers Allen, author, journalist, poet 
 Hiram Belcher, US congressman
 Supply Belcher, composer, musician
 Nathan Cutler, politician
 Robert Goodenow, US congressman
 Walter Gooley, state legislator
 Chester Greenwood, the inventor of earmuffs
 Wilhelmina Harper, librarian and author
 S. Clifton Ives, Methodist bishop
 Julia Harris May (1833–1912), founder of May School in Farmington
 Janet Mills, Governor of Maine,  former state attorney general
 Peter Mills, politician
 Samuel P. Morrill, US congressman and minister
 Lillian Nordica, singer
 Thomas Parker, Judge, early donor to Bates College
 Dan Simoneau, cross country skier
 Charlie Webster, state legislator and Chair of the Maine Republican Party
 Seth Wescott, first Olympic gold medalist in Snowboard Cross
 Henry Clay Wood, U.S. Army officer who received the Medal of Honor during the American Civil War
 Chandler Woodcock, state senator

See also
 Hiram Ramsdell House
 WUMF-FM
 WKTJ-FM

References

External links

 Town of Farmington, Maine
 Farmington Public Library

 
County seats in Maine